Notable earthquakes in the history of El Salvador include the following:

Earthquakes

See also 

 Geology of El Salvador

References

Other sources

 
 

 
El Salvador
Lists of events in El Salvador